Dipila is a village in the Darrang district under Sipajhar constituency.
From historical events, it is found that,
the name Dipila came from a king named Dippal.

References 

Villages in Darrang district
Cities and towns in Darrang district